Rtkovo is a village in the municipality of Kladovo, Serbia. According to the 2002 census, the village has a population of 1012 people.

References

Populated places in Bor District